Sudden Death is a 1977 action film directed by Eddie Romero, starring Robert Conrad, and costarring Thayer David, Larry Manetti and Nancy Conrad, Robert Conrad's real life daughter.

Plot

When Ed Neilson's (Ken Metcalf) entire family is viciously murdered, he pleads with retired CIA operative Duke Smith (Robert Conrad) to investigate. Smith refuses, but relents after Neilson too meets an explosive death.

With the aid of a former associate Wyatt Spain (Felton Perry), Smith attempts to find out who was responsible for the death of Neilson and his family. Meanwhile, a government agent, named John Shaw (John Ashley), has one of his men (Larry Manetti) follow Smith as Shaw was working with members of Neilson's company to get him out due to his sympathy for some people who are fighting for rights who call themselves "The Brown Hats".

Shaw enlists the services of hit-man Dominic Aldo (Don Stroud) from Corsica to take care of Smith. Smith has an associate, named "Buffalo" Tinker (Angelo Ventura), take his daughter Melissa (Nancy Conrad) and his wife Maya (Aline Samson) into hiding until things blow over. Aldo kills Tinker, and Smith and Spain kill the men responsible for the deaths of Neilson and his family. Smith shoots Shaw and fights Aldo, killing him.  At the end, Smith and Spain go to an island only to find that Aldo had earlier killed Smith's daughter and Maya.

Cast
 Robert Conrad as Duke Smith
 Don Stroud as Dominic Aldo
 Felton Perry as Wyatt Spain
 John Ashley as John Shaw
 Thayer David as Hauser
 Larry Manetti as Dan
 Chuck Courtney
 Eddie Garcia as Raoul Hidalgo

Production
The film was written for Conrad and Jim Kelly but Kelly dropped out. Conrad suggested Don Stroud and Ashley recommended Eddie Romero to direct it, "because he's not only knowledgeable, but oriented toward our end of the business over here in the U.S." said Ashley. Ashley produced the film for Caruth Byrd, who he called "a very wealthy guy from Dallas. It's actually a pretty decent little movie, but Caruth was not real knowledgable about the business. He found some fly-by- night company [Bryanston]that gave him some kind of deal, what was in his mind, a really good one. I kept saying that it's only a good deal if the picture makes money. I didn't know the company, and it didn't feel right to me."

Reception
Ashley said "The picture finally came out in a very limited release, no  publicity, nothing. It died and immediately went to tape. Tape then was not the big thing it is today... Bob Conrad was very upset about how  Caruth threw the movie away."

References

Note

External links

Trailer at YouTube

1977 films
Films directed by Eddie Romero
1977 action films
Philippine action films
Films shot in the Philippines
1970s English-language films
American action films
1970s American films